The tenth Annual American Music Awards were held on January 17, 1983.

Winners and nominees

References
 http://www.rockonthenet.com/archive/1983/amas.htm

1983